Dmitry 'Black Valet' Valent (born 13 April 1988 in Minsk, Belarus) is a Belarusian Muay Thai middleweight/super middleweight kickboxer. He is the former WKN Middleweight Oriental rules and Muay thai champion, former WMC Light Heavyweight champion, two time WMC I-1 World Muaythai Grand Slam champion and two time Kunlun Fight 80kg tournament runner-up.

Dmitry is one of Belarus's top fighters.

Career and biography

Amateur career
Valent had an extremely decorated amateur career before making his professional debut, although he  continued to fight amateur fights alongside professional ones between 2007 and 2012. He was the 2006 IFMA world silver medalist, as well as the 2009 and 2010 world gold medalist. In kickboxing, he was the 2007 WAKO World gold medalist and the 2010 European gold medalist.

Early career
Dmitry started training in Taekwondo at 13 years old before beginning Muay Thai aged 16.  At the prestigious "Kick Fighter Gym" in his home town of Minsk he developed his blossoming skills by training alongside world champions such as Andrei Kulebin and Dmitry Shakuta.  He would be a very quick learner, winning a gold medal in the 67 kg junior category at the 2006 W.M.F. World Muaythai Championships in Bangkok, Thailand, aged 17.  Dmitry then went on to have a very good 2007, winning a gold medal at the W.A.K.O. World Championships 2007 and then followed it up with his first professional title - winning the World Kickboxing Network (W.K.N.) middleweight world title, in Kostroma, Russia before rounding off the year in style by adding the professional W.A.K.O. world title to his collection.

Dmitry kicked off 2008 by winning the W.K.N. European Grand Prix title, a four-man tournament fought under Muay Thai rules in Geneva, Switzerland.  He then followed in the footsteps of stable mate Kulebin by winning the W.M.C. I-1 title – this one the Grand Slam 72 kg version – in Hong Kong.  There was some disappointment at the end of the year, however, when Dmitry was knocked out of the Season 2 qualifier of "The Contender Asia" held in Russia by multiple world champion Artem Levin at the semi final stage.  The fact that the Contender Asia Season 2 show would never come to light did soften the blow somewhat.  Dmitry had success on the amateur circuit as well, winning gold at the I.M.F.A. European championships held in Zgorzelec, Poland.

WKN and WMC World titles
The young Belarusian regained his W.M.C. I-1 title the following year, defeating South African Vuyisile Colossa by split decision in the final.  He followed up this victory by defeating 2007 W.K.A. world champion Shane Campbell for the second time to win the Muay Thai version of the middleweight W.K.N. title.  He carried on his form on the professional circuit onto the amateur circuit, winning a second amateur world championships by claiming gold at the I.F.M.A. event in Bangkok, Thailand. 
 
In 2010 Dmitry continued his winning ways remaining the W.K.N. organizations middleweight world champion in Thai-boxing by defeating the talented Yohan Lidon at the start of 2010 and beating the Dutch-based Moroccan Tarek Slimani to claim the W.I.P.U. "King of the Ring" world title.  He has suffered a few setbacks as well, losing to nemesis Artem Levin at the I.F.M.A. European Championships, and conceding a decision loss to legendary Aussie John Wayne Parr in an unsuccessful move down in weight to challenge for the W.K.N. super welterweight world title.  He also won more gold medals at amateur level, winning the 75 kg category at the W.A.K.O. European and I.F.M.A. world championships respectively.

He lost a decision to Karim Ghajji at Nuit des Champions in Marseilles on November 24, 2012.

In a close fight, Valent lost to Simon Marcus by split decision at C3: King of Fighters in Chengdu, China on April 27, 2013.

Chinese circuit
He fought at Diamond Fight: Friendship in Chelyabinsk, Russia on December 13, 2013, defeating Bektas Emirhanoglu by third-round TKO. He went on to amass a 3-2 record, during which he won the IPCC light heavyweight world title with a decision win against Wehaj Kingboxing, but losing it to Simon Marcus during KLF 12. He then took part in the 2015 Kunlun Fight – 80 kg Tournament, defeating Arthit Hanchana in the semifinal, but losing to Artur Kyshenko in the final.

Valent participated in the 2016 80 kg tournament as well, qualifying to it with an extra round decision against Cédric Tousch. In the tournament itself, he won a majority decision against Hicham El Gaoui in the semifinal, but once against lost in the final, dropping a split decision to Alexander Stetsurenko.

European circuit
Returning to the European circuit, Valent fought Yurii Zubchuk at the DSF Kickboxing Challenge 14. He lost a majority decision. He snapped the losing skid with a second round TKO of Serhii Snytiuk.

Valent made his ONE Championship debut against the two-time Tatneft Cup Champion Sher Mamazulunov at Road to ONE 4: Fair Fight 13. Mamazulunov won the fight by an extra round decision, although the fight results were controversial. The Fair Fight promotion analyzed the fight with an “independent judge”, and agreed to make the rematch, to which Valent consented.

Valent faced Carlos Prates at Muaythai Night 6 on June 25, 2021. He lost the fight by decision.

Titles
Professional
2016 Kunlun Fight 80 kg Tournament Runner-up
2015 Kunlun Fight 80 kg Tournament Runner-up
2013 WMC light heavyweight world champion
2013 Grand Prix Russia Open tournament champion
2010 W.I.P.U. "King of the Ring" Muay Thai world champion -75 kg
2009 W.K.N. Muay Thai middleweight world champion -76.2 kg (2 Title Def.)
2009 WMC I-1 World Muaythai Grand Slam champion -72 kg
2008 WMC I-1 World Muaythai Grand Slam champion -72 kg
2008 W.K.N. European Grand Prix champion -79 kg (Full Thai Rules)
2007 W.A.K.O. Pro Muaythai world champion -75 kg 
2007 W.K.N. oriental rules (K-1) middleweight world champion -76.4 kg

Amateur
2019 I.F.M.A. European Muaythai Championships   -86 kg
2018 I.F.M.A. European Muaythai Championships   -81 kg
2017 I.F.M.A. World Muaythai Championships   -81 kg
2016 I.F.M.A. World Muaythai Championships  -81 kg
2015 I.F.M.A. Muaythai Royal World Cup in Bangkok, Thailand  -81 kg
2014 I.F.M.A. European Muaythai Championships  -81 kg
2013 World Combat Games Muaythai  -81 kg
2013 I.F.M.A. European Muaythai Championships in Lisbon, Portugal  -75 kg
2010 I.F.M.A. World Muaythai Championships in Bangkok, Thailand  -75 kg 
2010 W.A.K.O. European Championships in Baku, Azerbaijan  -75 kg (K-1 Rules) 
2009 I.F.M.A. World Muaythai Championships in Bangkok, Thailand  -75 kg 
2008 I.F.M.A. European Muaythai Championships in Zgorzelec, Poland  -75 kg
2007 W.A.K.O. World Championships in Belgrade, Serbia  - 71 kg (K-1 Rules)
2006 I.F.M.A. World Muaythai Championships in Bangkok, Thailand  -67 kg
2006 W.M.F. World Muaythai Championships in Bangkok, Thailand  -67 kg (Junior)

Fight record

|-  style="background:#fbb;"
| 2021-06-25 || Loss ||align=left| Carlos Prates || Muaythai Night 6 || Abu Dhabi, United Arab Emirates || Decision || 3 || 3:00

|-  style="background:#fbb;"
| 2020-11-28 || Loss ||align=left| Sher Mamazulunov || Road to ONE 4: Fair Fight 13 || Yekaterinburg, Russia || Decision (Ext. Round)  || 4 || 3:00
|-  style="background:#cfc;"
| 2018-12-02 || Win ||align=left| Serhii Snytiuk|| Akhmat Fight Show || Belarus || TKO (Referee Stoppage/Left Body Hooks)  || 2 || 1:52
|-
|-  style="background:#fbb;"
| 2018-04-13|| Loss||align=left| Yurii Zubchuk ||DSF Kickboxing Challenge 14 || Poland || Decision (Majority) || 3 || 3:00
|-  style="background:#fbb;"
| 2016-12-10 || Loss ||align=left| Alexander Stetsurenko || Kunlun Fight 55 – 80 kg Tournament, Final || China || Decision (Split) || 3 || 3:00
|-
! style=background:white colspan=9 |
|-  style="background:#cfc;"
| 2016-12-10 || Win ||align=left| Hicham El Gaoui|| Kunlun Fight 55 – 80 kg Tournament, Semi Finals || China || Decision(Majority)  || 3 || 3:00
|-  style="background:#cfc;"
| 2016-09-10|| Win ||align=left| Cédric Tousch|| Kunlun Fight 51 - 80 kg 2016 Tournament Quarter-Finals || Fuzhou, China ||Extra Round Decision || 4 || 3:00
|-
! style=background:white colspan=9 |
|-  style="background:#fbb;"
| 2015-12-19 || Loss||align=left| Artur Kyshenko || Kunlun Fight 35 – 80 kg Tournament,Final || Luoyang, China || KO || 1 || 0:22
|-
! style=background:white colspan=9 |
|-  style="background:#cfc;"
| 2015-12-19 || Win ||align=left| Arthit Hanchana || Kunlun Fight 35 – 80 kg Tournament,Semi Final || Luoyang, China || Decision(Unanimous) || 3 || 3:00
|- style="background:#cfc;"
| 2015-07-19 || Win ||align=left| Chen Yawei || Kunlun Fight 28 || Nanjing, China || TKO || 3 ||
|- style="background:#fbb;"
| 2015-05-15 || Loss ||align=left| Artur Kyshenko || Kunlun Fight 25 || Bratislava, Slovakia || Decision (split) || 3 || 3:00
|- style="background:#fbb;"
| 2014-10-26 || Loss ||align=left| Simon Marcus || Kunlun Fight 12 || Jianshui, China || Decision || 3 || 3:00
|-
! style="background:white" colspan=9 |
|- style="background:#cfc;"
| 2014-09-13 || Win ||align=left| Panom  ||  Topking World Series   || Minsk, Belarus ||KO|| 2 ||0:46
|- style="background:#cfc;"
| 2014-06-29 || Win ||align=left| Wehaj Kingboxing || Kunlun Fight 6 || Chongqing, China ||Decision (unanimous)|| 5 ||3:00
|-
! style="background:white" colspan=9 | 
|- style="background:#cfc;"
| 2014-04-14|| Win ||align=left| Nuerla|| Kunlun Fight 1 || Surin, Thailand  ||KO (left knee to the body)|| 1 ||2:10
|-
|- style="background:#cfc;"
| 2013-12-13 || Win ||align=left| Bektas Emirhanoglu  || Diamon Fight: Friendship|| Chelyabinsk, Russia || TKO || 3 ||
|-
! style="background:white" colspan=9 | 
|- style="background:#fbb;"
| 2013-04-27 || Loss ||align=left| Simon Marcus || C3: King of Fighters || Chengdu, China || Decision (split) || 5 || 3:00
|- style="background:#cfc;"
| 2013-04-06 || Win ||align=left| Pawel Biszczak || Grand Prix Russia Open, Final || Moscow, Russia ||Decision (unanimous)|| 3 ||3:00
|-
! style="background:white" colspan=9 | 
|- style="background:#cfc;"
| 2013-04-06 || Win ||align=left| Wojciech Wierzbicki || Grand Prix Russia Open, Semi Finals || Moscow, Russia ||KO (low kick) || 1 || 1:00
|- style="background:#cfc;"
| 2013-04-06 || Win ||align=left| Oleg Hohlov || Grand Prix Russia Open, Quarter Finals || Moscow, Russia ||Decision (unanimous)|| 3 ||3:00
|- style="background:#fbb;"
| 2012-11-24 || Loss ||align=left| Karim Ghajji || Nuit des Champions || Marseilles, France || Decision || 5 || 3:00
|- style="background:#cfc;"
| 2011-11-26 || Win ||align=left| Samir Dourid ||  Big 8 WKN Tournament 2011  || Minsk, Belarus || Decision || 3 || 3:00
|-
! style="background:white" colspan=9 | 
|- style="background:#cfc;"
| 2010-09-12 || Win ||align=left| Tarek Slimani || W.K.N. World GP Big-8 Tournament '10, Title Fight || Minsk, Belarus || KO || 3 ||
|-
! style="background:white" colspan=9 | 
|- style="background:#fbb;"
| 2010-03-13 || Loss ||align=left| John Wayne Parr || Domination 4 || Bentley, Perth, Australia || Decision (Unanimous) || 5 || 3:00
|-
! style="background:white" colspan=9 | 
|- style="background:#cfc;"
| 2010-02-12 || Win ||align=left| Yohan Lidon || UKC France MAX 2010, Title Fight || Dijon, France || Decision (Unanimous) || 5 || 3:00
|-
! style="background:white" colspan=9 | 
|- style="background:#cfc;"
| 2009-09-12 || Win ||align=left| Shane Campbell || W.K.N. World GP Big-8 Tournament '09, Title Fight || Minsk, Belarus || Decision || 5 || 3:00
|-
! style="background:white" colspan=9 | 
|- style="background:#cfc;"
| 2009-10-22 || Win ||align=left| Vuyisile Colossa || W.M.C. I-1 World Grand Slam '09, Final || Hong Kong || Decision (Split) || 3 || 3:00
|-
! style="background:white" colspan=9 | 
|- style="background:#cfc;"
| 2009-10-22 || Win ||align=left| Pavlos Kaponis || W.M.C. I-1 World Grand Slam '09, Semi Finals || Hong Kong || TKO || 3 ||
|- style="background:#fbb;"
| 2008-12-19 || Loss ||align=left| Artem Levin || "The Contender Asia" Season 2 Russia Qualifier, Semi Finals || Chelyabinsk, Russia || Decision || 3 || 3:00
|- style="background:#cfc;"
| 2008-12-19 || Win ||align=left| Abdallah Mabel || "The Contender Asia" Season 2 Russia Qualifier, Quarter Finals || Chelyabinsk, Russia || Decision || 3 || 3:00
|- style="background:#cfc;"
| 2008-10-27 || Win ||align=left| Singnoi Sitpholek || W.M.C. I-1 World Grand Slam '08, Final || Hong Kong || KO || 2 ||
|-
! style="background:white" colspan=9 | 
|- style="background:#cfc;"
| 2008-10-27 || Win ||align=left| Shane Campbell || W.M.C. I-1 World Grand Slam '08, Semi Finals || Hong Kong || Decision (Unanimous) || 3 || 3:00
|- style="background:#cfc;"
| 2008-05-03 || Win ||align=left| Farid M'laika || W.K.N. European Grand Prix, Final || Geneva, Switzerland || KO (Spinning Elbow) || 2 ||
|-
! style="background:white" colspan=9 | 
|- style="background:#cfc;"
| 2008-05-03 || Win ||align=left| Alexandru Nedelcu || W.K.N. European Grand Prix, Semi Finals || Geneva, Switzerland || Decision || 3 || 3:00
|- style="background:#cfc;"
| 2007-12-9 || Win ||align=left| Fabio Siciliani || Wako-Pro World Title || Lecce, Italy || KO (Knee) || 2 ||
|-
! style="background:white" colspan=9 | 
|- style="background:#cfc;"
| 2007-11-11 || Win ||align=left| Samir Dourid || Kings of Muaythai - Russia || Kostroma, Russia || KO (Left Punch) || 1 ||
|-
! style="background:white" colspan=9 | 
|-
| colspan=9 | Legend:    
|-

|-  bgcolor="#cfc"
| 2019-11-10 || Win ||align=left| Andreas Gardasevic || 2019 IFMA European Championships, Final || Minsk, Belarus || Decision (30:26)|| 3 || 3:00 
|-
! style=background:white colspan=9 |

|-  bgcolor="#cfc"
| 2019-11-08 || Win ||align=left| Mikhail Sartakov || 2019 IFMA European Championships, Semi Final || Minsk, Belarus || Decision (30:27)|| 3 || 3:00 

|-  bgcolor="#cfc"
| 2018-07-07 || Win ||align=left| Ali Dogan || 2018 IFMA European Championships, Final || Prague, Czech Republic || Decision (29:28)|| 3 || 3:00 
|-
! style=background:white colspan=9 |

|-  bgcolor="#cfc"
| 2018-07-04 || Win ||align=left| Marcus Liljedorff || 2018 IFMA European Championships, Semi Final || Prague, Czech Republic || Decision (30:27)|| 3 || 3:00 

|-  bgcolor="#cfc"
| 2018-07-02 || Win ||align=left| Umarjov Davlatov || 2018 IFMA European Championships, Quarter Final || Prague, Czech Republic || Decision (29:28)|| 3 || 3:00 

|-  bgcolor="#cfc"
| 2017-05-12 || Win ||align=left| Saranon Glopman|| 2017 IFMA World Championships, Final || Minsk, Belarus || Decision (30:27) || 3 || 3:00
|-
! style=background:white colspan=9 |

|-  bgcolor="#cfc"
| 2017-05-10 || Win ||align=left| Rostyslav Karpych|| 2017 IFMA World Championships, Semi Final || Minsk, Belarus || Decision (30:27) || 3 || 3:00

|-  bgcolor="#cfc"
| 2017-05-08 || Win ||align=left| Sergey Veselkin || 2017 IFMA World Championships, Quarter Final || Minsk, Belarus || Decision (30:27) || 3 || 3:00

|-  bgcolor="#cfc"
| 2016-10-29 || Win ||align=left| Rostyslav Karpych|| 2016 IFMA European Championships, Final || Split, Croatia || Decision (30:27) || 3 || 3:00
|-
! style=background:white colspan=9 |

|-  bgcolor="#cfc"
| 2016-10-27 || Win ||align=left| Rafal Korczak || 2016 IFMA European Championships, Semi Final || Split, Croatia || Decision (30:27) || 3 || 3:00

|-  bgcolor="#cfc"
| 2016-10-25 || Win ||align=left| Busai Gergely || 2016 IFMA European Championships, Quarter Final || Split, Croatia || RSC.B || 1 || 

|-  bgcolor="#cfc"
| 2016-05- || Win ||align=left| Surik Magakian || 2016 IFMA World Championships, Final|| Jonkoping, Sweden ||Decision || 3 || 3:00 
|-
! style=background:white colspan=9 |

|-  bgcolor="#cfc"
| 2016-05- || Win ||align=left| Samuel Dbili || 2016 IFMA World Championships, Semi Final|| Jonkoping, Sweden || Decision || 3 || 3:00 

|-  bgcolor="#cfc"
| 2016-05- || Win ||align=left| || 2016 IFMA World Championships, Quarter Final|| Jonkoping, Sweden ||||  ||  

|-  bgcolor="#cfc"
| 2015-08- || Win ||align=left| Nadir Iskhakov || 2015 IFMA World Championships, Final|| Bangkok, Thailand ||Decision || 3 ||3:00 
|-
! style=background:white colspan=9 |

|-  bgcolor="#cfc"
| 2015-08- || Win ||align=left| Radoslaw Paczuski || 2015 IFMA World Championships, Semi Final|| Bangkok, Thailand ||RSC.O || 3 || 

|-  bgcolor="#cfc"
| 2015-08- || Win ||align=left| Shahram Delawar || 2015 IFMA World Championships, Quarter Final|| Bangkok, Thailand ||RSC.B || 3 || 

|-  bgcolor="#cfc"
| 2014-09- || Win ||align=left| Radosław Paczuski || 2014 IFMA European Championships, Final|| Krakow, Poland || ||  || 
|-
! style=background:white colspan=9 |

|-  bgcolor="#cfc"
| 2014-09- || Win ||align=left| Mykyta Zinchenko || 2014 IFMA European Championships, Semi Finals|| Krakow, Poland || ||  || 

|-  bgcolor="#cfc"
| 2014-09- || Win ||align=left| Youssef Issa || 2014 IFMA European Championships, Quarter Finals|| Krakow, Poland || ||  || 

|-  bgcolor="#cfc"
| 2014-05- || Win ||align=left| Surik Magakian || 2014 IFMA World Championships, Final|| Langkawi, Malaysia || ||  || 
|-
! style=background:white colspan=9 |

|-  bgcolor="#cfc"
| 2014-05- || Win ||align=left| Youssef Issa || 2014 IFMA World Championships, Semi Finals|| Langkawi, Malaysia || ||  || 

|-  bgcolor="#cfc"
| 2014-05- || Win ||align=left| Mykyta Zinchenko || 2014 IFMA World Championships, Quarter Finals|| Langkawi, Malaysia || ||  || 

|-  style="background:#fbb;"
| 2013-10-23 || Loss||align=left| Artem Levin || 2013 World Combat Games, Final || Bangkok, Thailand || Decision ||  || 
|-
! style=background:white colspan=9 |

|-  style="background:#cfc;"
| 2013-10-21 || Win ||align=left|   Kim Olaf Olsen || 2013 World Combat Games, Semi Final || Bangkok, Thailand || Decision ||  ||

|-  bgcolor="#cfc"
| 2012-09-11 || Win||align=left| Emil Umayev || 2012 IFMA World Championships, Semi Finals|| Saint Petersburg, Russia || Decision ||  || 

|-  bgcolor="#cfc"
| 2012-09-10 || Win||align=left| Ivan Konoriev|| 2012 IFMA World Championships, Quarter Finals|| Saint Petersburg, Russia || Decision ||  || 

|-  bgcolor="#cfc"
| 2012-09-08 || Win ||align=left| Kevin Victoa || 2012 IFMA World Championships, First Round|| Saint Petersburg, Russia ||  ||  || 

|- style="background:#cfc;"
| 2012-04-22 || Win ||align=left| Matouš Kohout || 2012 I.F.M.A. European Championships || Antalya, Turkey || || ||

|-  style="background:#fbb;"
| 2011-09-23|| Loss ||align=left| Vitaliy Nikiforov || 2011 IFMA World Championships, Quarter Finals || Tashkent, Uzbekistan || Decision || 4 || 2:00

|- style="background:#cfc;"
| 2010-12-05 || Win ||align=left| Valentin Semenov || I.F.M.A. World Muaythai Championships '10, Final -75 kg || Bangkok, Thailand || || ||
|-
! style="background:white" colspan=9 | 
|- style="background:#cfc;"
| 2010-10-24 || Win ||align=left| Wojciech Kosowski || W.A.K.O. European Championships '10 Baku, K-1 Finals -75 kg || Baku, Azerbaijan || Decision || 3 || 2:00
|-
! style="background:white" colspan=9 | 
|- style="background:#cfc;"
| 2010-10-? || Win ||align=left| Ile Risteski || W.A.K.O. European Championships '10 Baku, K-1 Quarter Finals -75 kg || Baku, Azerbaijan || KO || 1 ||
|- style="background:#fbb;"
| 2010-05-27 || Loss ||align=left| Artem Levin || I.F.M.A. European Championships '10, Quarter Finals || Velletri, Italy || Decision (5-0) || 4 || 2:00
|- style="background:#cfc;"
| 2010-05-26 || Win ||align=left| Şahin || I.F.M.A. European Championships '10, 1st Round || Velletri, Italy || || ||
|- style="background:#cfc;"
| 2009-12-05 || Win ||align=left| Vasyl Tereshonok || I.F.M.A. World Muaythai Championships '09, Final -75 kg || Bangkok, Thailand || Decision || 4 || 2:00
|-
! style="background:white" colspan=9 | 
|- style="background:#cfc;"
| 2009-12-02 || Win ||align=left| Emil Zoraj || IFMA 2009 World Muaythai Championships 1/2 finals (75 kg) || Bangkok, Thailand || Decision || 4 || 2:00
|- style="background:#cfc;"
| 2007-09-30 || Win ||align=left| Rizvan Isaev || W.A.K.O. World Championships 2007 Belgrade, K-1 Final -71 kg || Belgrade, Serbia || || ||
|-
! style="background:white" colspan=9 | 
|- style="background:#cfc;"
| 2007-09-? || Win ||align=left| Djime Coulibaly || W.A.K.O. World Championships 2007 Belgrade, K-1 Semi Finals -71 kg || Belgrade, Serbia || || ||
|- style="background:#cfc;"
| 2007-09-? || Win ||align=left| Osami Adil || W.A.K.O. World Championships 2007 Belgrade, K-1 Quarter Finals -71 kg || Belgrade, Serbia || || ||
|- style="background:#cfc;"
| 2007-09-? || Win ||align=left| Branko Mikulić || W.A.K.O. World Championships 2007 Belgrade, K-1 1st Round -71 kg || Belgrade, Serbia || || ||
|- style="background:#fbb;"
| 2006-06-06 || Loss ||align=left| Ameur Redwan || I.F.M.A. World Muaythai Championships '06, Semi Finals -67 kg || Bangkok, Thailand || || ||
|-
! style="background:white" colspan=9 | 
|- style="background:#cfc;"
| 2006-06-03 || Win ||align=left| Askarbek Shakiyev || I.F.M.A. World Muaythai Championships '06, Quarter Finals -67 kg || Bangkok, Thailand || || ||
|- style="background:#cfc;"
| 2006-03-26 || Win ||align=left| Mehmet Dogan || W.M.F. World Muaythai Championships '06, Junior Final -67 kg || Bangkok, Thailand || || ||
|-
! style="background:white" colspan=9 | 
|-
| colspan=9 |Legend:    
|-

See also 
List of male kickboxers

References

External links
 Gym "Kick Fighter" Official Website

1988 births
Living people
Belarusian male kickboxers
Belarusian Muay Thai practitioners
Belarusian male taekwondo practitioners
Middleweight kickboxers
Kunlun Fight kickboxers